58th parallel may refer to:

58th parallel north, a circle of latitude in the Northern Hemisphere
58th parallel south, a circle of latitude in the Southern Hemisphere